Nicole Penney Power (born ) is a Canadian actress, best known for her role as Shannon Ross in Kim's Convenience and its spin-off series Strays.

Early life and education
Power was born in St. John's, Newfoundland and Labrador and grew up in Middle Cove. She attended Memorial University of Newfoundland for one year of general studies before moving to Ontario, where she graduated from Sheridan College's Musical Theatre program and Second City's conservatory. Power also became a member of Soulpepper Theatre Academy.

Career
Power has appeared in Canadian stage productions of West Side Story, Bonnie and Clyde, Legally Blonde, La Cage aux Folles, Dog Sees God: Confessions of a Teenage Blockhead, Evangeline, and The Charlottetown Festival's production of Anne of Green Gables: The Musical.

She is a two-time Canadian Screen Award nominee for Best Supporting Actress for her role as Shannon in Kim's Convenience, receiving nominations at the 6th Canadian Screen Awards in 2018 and at the 8th Canadian Screen Awards in 2020.

In 2021 she was announced as the star of Strays, a spinoff of Kim's Convenience which will see Shannon Ross move to Hamilton, Ontario to embark on a new career.

References

External links

Living people
Canadian television actresses
Actresses from Newfoundland and Labrador
Canadian stage actresses
21st-century Canadian actresses
1989 births
1990 births 
Sheridan College alumni

People from St. John's, Newfoundland and Labrador